John Henry "Tun" Berger (December 6, 1867 – June 10, 1907) was a Major League Baseball player. He played for the Pittsburgh Alleghenys/Pirates and Washington Senators. In his career, he hit one home run and had 57 RBI, 40 which came in 1890 for the Alleghenys.

External links

Major League Baseball catchers
Pittsburgh Alleghenys players
Pittsburgh Pirates players
Washington Senators (1891–1899) players
Baseball players from Pittsburgh
1867 births
1907 deaths
19th-century baseball players
Steubenville Stubs players
Johnstown (minor league baseball) players
Mansfield (minor league baseball) players
Canton Nadjys players
Indianapolis Hoosiers (minor league) players
Erie Blackbirds players
Rochester Browns players
St. Paul Apostles players
Scranton Miners players
Cortland Hirelings players
Rochester Brownies players
Montreal Royals players
Norfolk Jewels players
Newark Colts players